St. John the Baptist Roman Catholic Church is a Roman Catholic church in Pottsville, Pennsylvania. The seventh oldest church in the Allentown Diocese, it was established in 1841, and is located at Tenth & Mahantongo Streets. The current structure was built in 1872.

History
St. John the Baptist Church was founded in 1841 by German Catholic immigrants, mostly from Grossenlueder (a village near Fulda) and the Rhenish Palatinate. The original church at Fourth Street & Howard Avenue was built by the parishioners themselves, many of whom were skilled stonemasons and carpenters. With the influx of German Catholic immigrants into Schuylkill County, the parish soon increased tremendously. In 1869, construction on the present church began, and it was finished in 1872. It towers over the landscape of the western end of Pottsville.

In 1878, Father Frederick W. Longinus was appointed rector of the church. Father Longinus was well respected and loved by the parish, where he remained as rector until his death in 1932. In 1905, the original St. John's at Fourth & Howard, which was no longer in use, was sold to the Italian Catholic community, and became St. Joseph's Church.

Points of interest
Included in the present St. John's are priceless stained glass windows by the German artisan Wilhelm Derrix. These windows are valued to be worth over two million dollars. Also included in the church are valuable statues imported from Germany over 100 years ago.

Cemetery
The original cemetery, which dates back to the founding of the parish in 1841, is located at 8th & Pierce Streets. Unfortunately, many of the inscriptions on the headstones are worn away and barely visible. The present cemetery, located at 20th & Mahantongo Streets, however, is in excellent condition. In the center of the cemetery is a large crucifix, which stands over the grave of the beloved Fr. Longinus. A plaque at the base of the crucifix reads:
.

The inscription comes from the Books of Maccabees, and was inscribed to remind parishioners to pray for the Holy Souls in Purgatory.

References

External links
SaintJohnPottsville.org
List of churches in Pottsville, Pennsylvania

Pottsville, Pennsylvania
Roman Catholic churches in Pennsylvania
Roman Catholic Diocese of Allentown
German-American culture in Pennsylvania
Churches in Schuylkill County, Pennsylvania
Religious organizations established in 1841
Roman Catholic churches completed in 1872
19th-century Roman Catholic church buildings in the United States